"Have It All" was the fourth and final single to be released off the Foo Fighters' fourth album One by One. Its B-side, a cover of Prince's "Darling Nikki", became successful at US alternative radio, peaking at number 15 there.

Live performances
"Have It All" was played often on the One by One tour. It was played occasionally on the In Your Honor tour, and made one appearance on the Echoes Silence Patience and Grace tour in 2008. It was not played again until the Sonic Highways tour in 2015.

Track listing
"Have It All"
"Darling Nikki" (Prince cover)
"Disenchanted Lullaby" (live, acoustic Radio1 UK, 19 August 2003)
"Weenie Beenie" (live)
"Weenie Beenie" (live) was a misprint on the inlay on the US version of the CD, meaning all CDs only include "Have It All", "Darling Nikki", and "Disenchanted Lullaby" (live, acoustic Radio1 UK, 19 August 2003).

Personnel
 Dave Grohl – vocals, rhythm guitar
 Chris Shiflett – lead guitar
 Nate Mendel – bass
 Taylor Hawkins – drums

Chart positions
A-side: "Have It All"

B-side: "Darling Nikki"

References

2003 singles
Foo Fighters songs
Song recordings produced by Nick Raskulinecz
Songs written by Dave Grohl
2002 songs
RCA Records singles
Songs written by Taylor Hawkins
Songs written by Nate Mendel
Songs written by Chris Shiflett